Jim Kurose (born 1956) is a Distinguished University Professor in the College of Information and Computer Sciences at the University of Massachusetts Amherst.

He was born in Greenwich, Connecticut, USA. He received his B.A. degree from Wesleyan University (physics) and, in 1984, his Ph.D. degree from Columbia University (computer science). Kurose's main area of teaching is computer networking. He is a coauthor of the well-known textbook Computer Networking: A Top-Down Approach.

In 2020, he was elected a member of the National Academy of Engineering for contributions to the design and analysis of network protocols for multimedia communication.

Career 

Kurose became a faculty member of Computer Science in University of Massachusetts Amherst after he finished his doctoral degree in 1984. Kurose was a visiting scientist at the University Paris, Institut Eurecom, INRIA, Technicolor and IBM Research. He has been a member of the Scientific Council of Institute IMDEA Networks since 2007, and a member of the Board of Directors of the Computing Research Association.

Since January 2015, Dr. Kurose has been on leave from the University of Massachusetts, serving as the Assistant Director of the National Science Foundation (NSF) for Computer and Information Science and Engineering (CISE). He leads the CISE Directorate, with an annual budget of more than $900 million. Dr. Kurose also serves as co-chair of the Networking and Information Technology Research and Development Subcommittee of the National Science and Technology Council Committee on Technology, facilitating the coordination of networking and information technology research and development efforts across Federal agencies.

Awards 
Dr. Kurose has received the following awards:
 Taylor Booth Award of the IEEE in 2001 
 IEEE Communications Society INFOCOM 2013 Achievement Award
 ACM Sigcomm Special Interest Group (SIG) Lifetime achievement award in 2016

References 

University of Massachusetts Amherst faculty
1956 births
Living people
Wesleyan University alumni
Columbia University alumni
Fellows of the Association for Computing Machinery
Fellow Members of the IEEE